The Christopher S. Bond Bridge in Kansas City, Missouri (often referred to as the New Paseo Bridge) is a cable-stayed bridge across the Missouri River. It carries I-29/I-35/US 71. The bridge opened to limited traffic on September 27, 2010 and all lanes opened on December 18, 2010. The Bond bridge is a replacement for the Paseo Bridge.

The bridge is named for Christopher "Kit" Bond, the former Missouri Governor and United States Senator.

History
On November 14, 2007, MoDOT announced plans for a complete replacement of the Paseo Bridge. The new bridge increased the roadway capacity from two lanes each direction to three lanes southbound on the bridge and 4 lanes northbound on the bridge, one northbound lane being an auxiliary lane. The bridge is designed to have four through lanes each way at a future date without needing to widen the bridge.

In December 2007, the Federal Aviation Administration warned that the pylon might interfere with traffic at Kansas City Downtown Airport, one mile to the west. Construction on the Bond bridge began in April 2008, just downstream of the Paseo bridge. This allowed the Paseo bridge to remain open to traffic during construction. With the opening of the Bond bridge, demolition of the Paseo bridge started, and was completed on July 1, 2011.

The bridge is part of a $245 million project that upgraded an approximately  section of the I-29/I-35 corridor to six lanes. The contractor is Paseo Corridor Constructors (PCC), a joint venture team composed of Clarkson Construction Company, Massman Construction Co., and Kiewit Construction Co. The bridge was designed by Parsons Corporation and Bradley Touchstone of the DodStone Group of Tallahassee, Florida was the bridge architect. The firm also designed the John James Audubon Bridge in Louisiana, which is the longest cable-stayed bridge in North America.

See also
 
 
 
 List of crossings of the Missouri River

References

Cable-stayed bridges in the United States
Bridges in Kansas City, Missouri
Road bridges in Missouri
Interstate 29
Interstate 35
U.S. Route 71
Bridges on the Interstate Highway System
Bridges of the United States Numbered Highway System